Alvin Cramer Segal  (September 19, 1933 – November 4, 2022), previously Alvin Cramer, was an American-born Canadian businessman and philanthropist. He was chairman and chief executive officer of Peerless Clothing, a men's suit manufacturer.

Early and career
Born in Albany, New York, Alvin Cramer attended the Arnold Avenue School in Amsterdam, then School No. 16 in Albany, and next the Irving Prep School for Boys. He passed grades nine and ten at Stanstead College, then entered grade eleven at the High School of Montreal, where he was joined by his sisters Connie and Harriet. At that time, for family reasons his sisters changed their name from Cramer to Segal, but he continued to be known as Cramer until some years later. He did not graduate from high school, as he failed in French, which was a compulsory subject in Montreal.

Going into business, he established the Peerless Clothing company.

Personal life and death
Segal died on November 4, 2022, at the age of 89.

Honours
In 2002, Segal was made a Member of the Order of Canada in recognition for being "a visionary entrepreneur" and an "outstanding spokesperson and leader for the apparel industry in Canada". In 2010, he was promoted to Officer of the Order of Canada for having "set an example of corporate philanthropy". In 2011, he was made an Officer of the National Order of Quebec. He also received a Doctor Honoris Causa of Hebrew University (2015).

References

1933 births
2022 deaths
American emigrants to Canada
Businesspeople from Montreal
Canadian philanthropists
High School of Montreal alumni
Officers of the Order of Canada
Officers of the National Order of Quebec
Stanstead College alumni
Jewish American philanthropists
Jewish Canadian philanthropists